The Hoko River is a river in the U.S. state of Washington. Its largest tributary is the Little Hoko River, which joins at river mile . The lower  of the Hoko River is estuarine.

Because the Hoko River, like the nearby Pysht River, is brushy, full of snags, and often carries tannin stained water, it is known as a "cedar creek".

The name Hoko is of Makah origin and refers to the large projecting rock at the river mouth.

The Hoko River is the namesake of the Late Eocene Hoko River Formation, which was formally described in 1976 by Parke D. Snavely, Jr. et al from outcrops along the river.

Sites along the Hoko River have proved it to be an ideal location for preserving artifacts, bones, antlers, and baskets from the past. Hooks, cordage used for lines, and drying racks made from wood have all been found near the Hoko River sites. These artifacts' production is dated to around 1000 BCE.

See also
List of rivers of Washington

References

External links
USGS gage 12034400 Hoko River, USGS Water-Date Report 2008

Rivers of Washington (state)
Rivers of Clallam County, Washington